Abbey of the Dormition is a Catholic abbey belonging to the Benedictine Order in Jerusalem, on Mount Zion just outside the walls of the Old City near the Zion Gate. The Abbey is said to mark the spot where Mary, mother of Jesus, died.

Between 1998 and 2006 the community was known as the Abbey of Hagia Maria Sion, in reference to the basilica of Hagia Sion that stood on this spot during the Byzantine period, but it resumed the original name during the 2006 celebrations of the monastery's centenary. "Hagia Maria Sion" is now the name of the foundation supporting the abbey's buildings, community and academic work.

In recent years the church has become a target for vandalism and desecration by extremist Israeli nationalist religious youths..

History of creation

The Byzantine basilica Hagia Sion was built under John II, Bishop of Jerusalem in the early 5th century. Relics attributed to Saint Stephen were transferred to the church on 26 December 415. The church is shown in the 6th-century Madaba Map.
It was destroyed in the 614 sack of Jerusalem by Sasanian king Khosrau II.
Its foundations were recovered in 1899, when the architect and construction manager of the Diocese of Cologne,  (1868–1928), investigated the site. Bargil Pixner proposed the theory of a pre-Crusader Church of Zion, the continuation of an early Judeo-Christian congregation and their house of worship, which he located on the Madaba Map next to the Hagia Sion basilica.
A monastic order known as the Abbey of Our Lady of Mount Zion was established at the site in the 12th century, with a church built on the ruins of the earlier demolished Byzantine church. The 12th century church was again destroyed in the 13th century, and the monks moved to Sicily. The order was eventually absorbed into the Jesuits in 1617 (the Congregation of Notre-Dame de Sion is an unrelated monastic order founded in 1843).

The order was chosen as the namesake of the "Priory of Sion hoax" created by French esotericist Pierre Plantard during the 1960s.

Modern building

During his visit to Jerusalem in 1898 for the dedication of the Lutheran Church of the Redeemer, Kaiser Wilhelm II bought this piece of land on Mount Zion for 120,000 German Goldmark from Sultan Abdul Hamid II and presented it to the "German Association of the Holy Land" (":de:Deutscher Verein vom Heiligen Lande").

Conrad Schick reported about the event, describing the acquired plot of land and showing confidence that the remains of the ancient Zion Church would be discovered under the accumulated dirt.

According to local tradition, it was on this spot, near the site of the Last Supper, that the Blessed Virgin Mary died, or at least ended her worldly existence. Both in Orthodoxy and Catholicism, as in the language of scripture, death is often called a "sleeping" – or "falling asleep" – and this gave the original monastery its name. The church itself is called Basilica of the Assumption (or Dormition). In the Catholic dogma of the Assumption of Mary, Christ's mother was taken, body and soul, to heaven.

Renard delivered the designs and plans for the Abbey, the direction of construction was entrusted to the architect , a member of the Temple Society and a resident of Jerusalem. The foundation stone was laid on 7 October 1900. Construction was completed in only ten years; the basilica was dedicated on 10 April 1910 by the Latin Patriarch of Jerusalem. The Abbey was built in an ecclesiastical, neo-Romanesque style that had become the state style of the new Imperial Germany.

The present church is a circular building with several niches containing altars, and a choir. Two spiral staircases lead to the crypt, the site ascribed to the Dormition of the Virgin Mary, and also to the organ-loft and the gallery, from where two of the church's four towers are accessible.

Out of regard for the nearby Jewish and Muslim sacred place of David's Tomb, which occupies part of the ground floor of the Cenacle, where it has traditionally been said that the Last Supper took place, the belltower is set far enough away that its shadow does not touch the tomb, and is therefore not directly accessible from the church.

Benedictine community
The first monks had already been sent to Jerusalem in 1906 from Beuron Archabbey in Germany. They were interned for the first time in 1918–1921, after the end of World War I. In 1926 the monastery was raised to the status of an abbey within the Beuron Congregation. Between 1939 and 1945, the German monks were interned for the second time, and then for the third time as the result of the 1948 Arab-Israeli War<1947-1949>. The abbey was located in the Israeli-controlled territory on mount Zion, across from the Jordanian-controlled territory within the walled city.

In 1951, the abbey was separated from the Beuron Congregation and placed under the direct supervision of the Abbot-Primate of the Benedictines in Rome.

The community elected its own abbot for the first time in 1979.

Theology seminar
Since 1973 the abbey has been hosting an ecumenical year of study for outstanding students of theology from Germany, Austria and Switzerland. The curriculum encompasses biblical, Eastern Orthodox Church, Judaic and Islamic studies.

Vandalism
The Dormition Abbey, along with other Christian sites, has been the target of occasional vandalism as a form of "price tag" terrorism by extremist Israeli nationalist religious youths.

In October 2012 and in May and June 2013 the abbey was vandalized with anti-Christian graffiti and insults in Hebrew. The offensive words compared Christians to monkeys and called for revenge against Jesus. Two cars were also covered with graffiti and all tyres were slashed. One of the gates of the nearby Greek Orthodox cemetery was also marked with graffiti. This was allegedly a "price tag" attack carried out by nationalist religious extremists for the dismantling of an illegal outpost Havat Ma'on.

On 26 May 2014 a box of wooden crosses was set ablaze inside the Dormition Abbey. It is believed that this was some sort of failed arson attempt. At the same time of the arson attempt, Pope Francis was conducting a service in the building next door in the Cenacle two floors above the room of King David's Tomb.

A nationalist religious Jew entered the premises by jumping over a fence in December 2014 and went on to damage a crucifix, a bench and a number of statues in the cemetery, one of which marked the grave of a monk with Israeli nationality.

In January 2016, vandals wrote slogans on the walls of the Abbey such as "Death to the heathen Christians the enemies of Israel" and "May his name be obliterated" (whose first letters in Hebrew spell the name of Jesus). Gregory Collins, who was then the abbot, addressed a crowd of demonstrators for peace in Galilee, saying that: “The attack on the church is an attack on all those who believe in a civilization of love and coexistence.”

References

Gallery

External links

  Website of Dormition Abbey

Religious buildings and structures completed in 1910
Benedictine monasteries in Israel
Roman Catholic monasteries in Jerusalem
Roman Catholic churches in Jerusalem
Basilica churches in Asia
20th-century Christian monasteries
Mount Zion
Vandalized works of art